Lawndale Township is located in McLean County, Illinois, east of Lexington, northwest of Colfax, and southeast of Chenoa. As of the 2010 census, its population was 158 and it contained 74 housing units. It’s Township Road Commissioner is Jeff Winterland. Lawndale Cemetery is located on 2550 North Road.  At least part of the township is within the area of the proposed Lexington Chenoa Wind Farm to be developed by Horizon Wind Energy.

Geography

Demographics

References

External links
City-data.com
Illinois State Archives
Lawndale Township - Pantagraph

Townships in McLean County, Illinois
Townships in Illinois